Jinn is a 4-member Japanese rock band. They are part of Sony Music Entertainment Japan's Palm Beach record label.

History
The members of Jinn all attended the same high school, and formed the band in Tokyo in the summer of 2003. In March 2004, the band recorded a demo CD, with 500 copies selling out quickly. 
l
After that in 2005, the band recorded a mini album, . In August 2006, the single  was released, which was featured as the final opening theme to the Blood+ anime series. On November 22 the same year, Jinn also released another single, .

In 2007, Jinn performed the second opening theme to the Sunrise anime series Code Geass: Lelouch of the Rebellion, which was released on January 31, 2007. Their first full album, was released on February 28, 2007. Their second album, Qualia was released on February 6, 2008.

A mini album was released July 2010 entitled 'Engine'.

After 2 years, they returned with 2 singles:Mugen No Hikari/Blue Scale and Rizing. On June 5, 2013 the band released its 3rd album, For The Seeker.

Members
 (vocals)
born March 3, 1987

 (guitars, chorus, strings)
born May 16, 1986

 (bass)
born July 10, 1985

 (drums)
born January 19, 1987

Discography

Albums
 (released on February 28, 2007)
 (released on February 6, 2008)
For The Seeker (released on June 5, 2013)

Extended plays
 (indie release on March 3, 2005; major label release on May 24, 2006)
 (released on July 14, 2010)

CD-R
 (2004)

Singles
 (released on August 2, 2006; fourth and final opening theme to Blood+)
 (released on November 22, 2006)
 (released on January 31, 2007; second opening theme to CODE Geass Lelouch of the Rebellion)
"Vuena Vista" (released on July 18, 2007)
"Mugen No Hikari／Blue scale" (夢幻の光／ブルースケール) (released on April 27, 2012)
"RIZING" (released on May 8, 2013)

PV's

"Vuena Vista"

"RIZING"

External links
Jinn Official Website 
Jinn members' blogs  
ing Special Blog 

Sony Music Entertainment Japan artists
Japanese rock music groups
Japanese indie rock groups
Musical groups established in 2003
Musical groups from Tokyo